The women's 5000 metres walk event at the 1998 World Junior Championships in Athletics was held in Annecy, France, at Parc des Sports on 1 August.

Medalists

Results

Final
1 August

Participation
According to an unofficial count, 35 athletes from 23 countries participated in the event.

References

5000 metres walk
Racewalking at the World Athletics U20 Championships